The Samaritan woman at the well is a figure from the Gospel of John. John 4:4–42 relates her conversation with Jesus at Jacob's Well near the city of Sychar.

Biblical account

The woman appears in :

This episode takes place before the return of Jesus to Galilee. Some Jews regarded the Samaritans as foreigners and their attitude was often hostile, although they shared most beliefs, while many other Jews accepted Samaritans as either fellow Jews or as Samaritan Israelites. The two communities seem to have drifted apart in the post-exilic period. Both communities share the Pentateuch, although crucially the Samaritan Pentateuch locates the holy mountain at Mount Gerizim rather than at Mount Zion, as this incident acknowledges at John 4:20.

The Gospel of John, like the Gospel of Luke, is favourable to the Samaritans throughout, and, while the Matthaean Gospel quotes Jesus at one early phase in his ministry telling his followers to not at that time evangelize any of the cities of the Samaritans, this restriction had clearly been reversed later by the time of Matthew 28:19. Scholars differ as to whether the Samaritan references in the New Testament are historical. One view is that the historical Jesus had no contact with Samaritans; another is that the accounts go back to Jesus himself. In Acts 1:8, Jesus promises the apostles that they will be witnesses to the Samaritans.

Interpretations
Scholars have noted that this story appears to be modelled on a standard betrothal 'type scene' from Hebrew scripture, particularly that of Jacob in Genesis 29. This convention, which would have been familiar to Jewish readers, following on from an earlier scene in which John the Baptist compares his relationship to Jesus with that of the friend of a bridegroom. Jo-Ann A. Brant, for example, concludes that there is "near consensus among literary critics that the scene at Jacob’s well follows conventions of the betrothal type-scene found in Hebrew narrative." Other scholars note significant differences between John 4 and betrothal type-scenes in the Hebrew Bible. For example, Dorothy A. Lee lists several discrepancies between Hebrew betrothal scenes and John 4: “the Samaritan woman is not a young Jewish virgin and no betrothal takes place; the well is not concerned with sexual fertility but is an image of salvation (see Isa. 12:3); Jesus is presented not as a bridegroom but as giver of living water.”

This Gospel episode is referred to as "a paradigm for our engagement with truth", in the Roman Curia book A Christian reflection on the New Age, as the dialogue says: "You worship what you do not know; we worship what we know" and offers an example of "Jesus Christ the bearer of the water of life". The passages that comprise John 4:10–26 are sometimes referred to as the Water of Life Discourse, which forms a complement to the Bread of Life Discourse.

Roger Baxter in his Meditations comments on this passage saying:
Consider the excellence of this living water, which is Divine grace, and which Christ promises to His faithful servants. " He that shall drink of the water that I will give him, shall not thirst forever." It quenches, therefore, forever, the thirst of the soul, and satisfies it. The soul then no longer thirsts after earthly waters, that is, the pleasures of this world. It becomes a fountain of all good to the soul, ever flowing and giving merit to our actions. " It springs up to everlasting life" (John iv. 14), elevating our thoughts to heaven and heavenly joys, of which it is a pledge. Say, therefore, with the Samaritan woman, " Give me this water, that I may not thirst."

Veneration 

In Eastern Orthodox tradition, she is venerated as a saint with the name Photine, meaning "luminous [one]". In Roman Catholic tradition, older editions of the Roman Martyrology list a martyr named Photina of Samaria on March 20, whom commentators have identified with the woman at the well.

In Eastern Christian tradition, the woman's name at the time of her meeting Jesus is unknown, though she was later baptized "Photine". She is celebrated as a saint of renown. Her continuing witness is said to have brought so many to the Christian faith that she is described as "equal to the apostles". Eventually, having drawn the attention of Emperor Nero, she was brought before him to answer for her faith, suffering many tortures and dying a martyr after being thrown down a dry well. She is remembered on the Sunday four weeks after Pascha, which is known as "the Sunday of the Samaritan Woman".

In Oaxaca, Oaxaca, Mexico, a celebration of the Samaritan woman takes place on the fourth Friday of Lent. The custom of the day involves churches, schools, and businesses giving away fruit drinks to passers-by.

Photini, The Samaritan Woman is honored with a Lesser Feast on the liturgical calendar of the Episcopal Church in the United States of America on February 26.

Cultural references

In visual art

In music 
 Jesus Met the Woman at the Well, a gospel song dating from 1949 or before (earliest known recording by The Fairfield Four)
Lift Him Up That's All, a gospel song dating from 1927 or before (earliest known recording by Washington Phillips)
 The Woman of Samaria, a sacred cantata of 1867 by the English classical composer William Sterndale Bennett
 The Maid and the Palmer also known as The Well Below The Valley (Roud 2335, Child ballad 21)
 "Woman at the Well", by Olivia Lane
 “Jesus gave me Water”, 1951 by The Soul Stirrers

In film and television 
The Samaritan woman is played by Vanessa DeSilvio in the multi-season show on the life of Christ, The Chosen. Her meeting with Jesus concludes the first season. In the beginning of season 2, she is seen again, eagerly telling everyone around her about Jesus.

See also

 Asian feminist theology
 Domnina (daughter of Nero)
 Jesus' interactions with women
 List of names for the biblical nameless
 Parable of the Good Samaritan
 Living Water

References

Notes

Citations

Sources

Further reading

External links 
 Photine  of Samaria at orthodoxwiki.org
 

1st-century Christian martyrs
Ancient Samaritan people
Christian saints from the New Testament
Converts to Christianity
Followers of Jesus
Gospel episodes
Gospel of John
Water and religion
Women in the New Testament
John 4
Water wells in Israel
Unnamed people of the Bible
Anglican saints